Yujing, yu-jing, or variation, may refer to:

Places
 Yujing District, Tainan, Taiwan
 Yujing Town (余井镇), Qianshan County, Anqing Prefecture, Anhui Province, China; see List of township-level divisions of Anhui
 Yujing Town (玉井镇), Shanyin County, Shuozhou Prefecture, Shanxi Province, China; see List of village-level divisions of Shanxi
 Yujing Township, Enyang District, Bazhong Prefecture, Sichuan Province, China; see Enyang District
 Yujing Square (愉景广场商圈), Guancheng Subdistrict, Dongguan City, Guangdong Province, China; see Guancheng Subdistrict

Facilities and structures
 Yujing Hot Spring Resort Hotel, Yangxi County, Yangjiang Prefecture, Guangdong Province, China, see Yangxi County
 Yujing Center, Dalian, China; a 350m supertall skyscraper, see List of tallest structures – 300 to 400 metres

Other places
 Yu Jing (Jade Well), a Chinese asterism in the IAU constellations of Orion and Eridanus; in the Chinese celestial mansion of Three Stars (Chinese constellation)
 Yujing Feng, China; an ultra-tall mountain, see List of Ultras of Tibet, East Asia and neighbouring areas

People
 Yu Jing (born 1985), Chinese longtrack speedskater
 Yu Jing (sledge hockey) (born 1983), Chinese sledge hockey player

Mythological
 Yujing (禺京) descendant of the Yellow Emperor, also known as 禺强, Yuqiang

See also

Yu (disambiguation)
Jing (disambiguation)
Jingyu (disambiguation)